Thirumazhapadi is a village in the Ariyalur taluk of Ariyalur district, Tamil Nadu, India.

Demographics 

As per the 2001 census, Thirumazhapadi had a total population of 2718 with 1352 males and 1366 females.

References 

Villages in Ariyalur district